The 2002 Croatian Figure Skating Championships ( took place between 21 and 23 December. Skaters competed in the disciplines of men's singles and ladies' singles.

Senior results

Men

Ladies

Junior results

Ladies

External links
 results

Croatian Figure Skating Championships
2001 in figure skating
Croatian Figure Skating Championships, 2002
2001 in Croatian sport
2002 in Croatian sport